August Leskien (8 July 1840 – 20 September 1916) was a German linguist active in the field of comparative linguistics, particularly relating to the Baltic and Slavic languages.

Biography

Leskien was born in Kiel. He studied philology at the universities of Kiel and Leipzig, receiving his doctorate from the latter in 1864. In 1866, he began studying comparative linguistics under August Schleicher at the University of Jena. He completed his habilitation in 1867 and went on to lecture at the University of Göttingen.

He was appointed  as the extraordinary professor (außerordentlicher Professor) of comparative linguistics and Sanskrit at Jena in 1868. Two years later, he was named as the extraordinary professor of Slavic philology at the University of Leipzig, where he delivered the first course there in Slavic languages. He was promoted to full professorship (ordentlicher Professor) in 1876 and remained in the position until 1915.

In 1884 he became an editor of Ersch and Gruber's Realencyklopädie. Leskien was a founding member of the journal . He died in Leipzig.

Research, writings and thought

Leskien was a central figure in the group of linguists at Leipzig who later became known as the Neogrammarians. The group strove to approach linguistics in a scientific manner; Leskien formulated their main doctrine, namely that phonetic laws have no exceptions (Ausnahmslosigkeit der Lautgesetze). Leskien's hypothesis was that phonetic shifts do not occur randomly or haphazardly, but instead are the product of directly observable conditions. Among the students that Leskien taught are: Jan Niecisław Baudouin de Courtenay, Ferdinand de Saussure, Leonard Bloomfield, Nikolai Trubetzkoy, Karl Verner and Adolf Noreen. Thus Leskien can be seen as a key founder of modern comparative linguistics, particularly in the fields of Baltic and Slavic languages.

In his 1881 essay '', Leskien formulated Leskien's Law, a sound law devised to describe a particular aspect of sound change in Lithuanian. According to this law long vowels, along with the diphthongs ie and uo, with an acute intonation are shortened in the final syllable of a word. Although superseded in places by more recent studies, the book is still in print and remains in use by scholars to the present day. With Karl Brugmann, he edited Litauische Volkslieder und Märchen (“Lithuanian Folk Songs and Tales”; 1882).

Other works include:

Indogermanische Chrestomathie, with Ebel, Schleicher, and Schmidt (1869)
Die Deklination im Slawisch-Litauischen und Germanischen (1876)
Untersuchungen über Quantität und Betonung in den slawischen Sprachen (1885–93)
Die Bildung der Nomina im Litauischen (1891)

Notes

References
 Walther Killy and Rudolf Vierhaus (eds.) (1997). Deutsche Biographische Enzyklopädie (DBE). Volume 6: Kogel – Maxsein. München (u. a.): K.G. Saur. .
 Wilhelm Streitberg: "". In:  I (1913). .
 Wilhelm Streitberg: "". In:  VII (1919). .
 Harald Wiese: , Logos Verlag Berlin, 2007.

External links
 

Balticists
1840 births
1916 deaths
Writers from Kiel
People from the Duchy of Holstein
Linguists from Germany
Slavists
Linguists of Indo-European languages
Leipzig University alumni
Academic staff of Leipzig University
University of Jena alumni
Academic staff of the University of Jena
University of Kiel alumni
Academic staff of the University of Göttingen
Corresponding members of the Saint Petersburg Academy of Sciences
Great Officers of the Order of St. Sava
Members of the Royal Society of Sciences in Uppsala
Foreign members of the Serbian Academy of Sciences and Arts